Algete is a town and municipality in central Spain. It lies in the comarca de Alcalá in the autonomous community of the Community of Madrid. It had a population of 19,345 in 2008.

Sights include the church of Asunción de Nuestra Señora.

History 
There are no records of the first settlements in Algete. There are remains of human settlements in the Iron Age found in the fertile plain of Jarama. Remains of Roman villas and Visigoth settlements have also been found.

It is known that it was inhabited in Arabic times due to the existence of qanat or underground waterways. From this period may come its name, derived from Al-Satt, which means the bank (by the River Jarama).

In 1081, Alfonso VI began the reconquest of the Jarama basin, expelling the Muslims and repopulating the area with Christians from the South.

In the 16th century, Algete became a town. The church was rebuilt, possibly on top of a Romanesque church. In 1579, Pope Gregory XIII disaffected Algete from the Archbishopric of Toledo and transferred it to the Crown. Philip II sold it for twenty thousand ducats to García Hurtado de Mendoza, Marqués de Cañete and Viceroy of Peru.

In 1728, Philip V named Algete a Duchy in favor of Christopher of Moscoso and Montemayor. The cadastral data of this time speak of a population of "290 neighbors living in 282 houses", increasing the number of inhabitants to 1,263 in just a few years.

Already in the 19th century, Alfonso XII visited the municipality in 1883, and in 1891 the first municipal school was built.

In the 20th century, when the Spanish Civil War began, Algete remained on the Republican side. Several religious images were burnt and the organ of the church was destroyed.

In the decade of the sixties, development arrives little by little to the municipality: the first industrial areas are born, water is channeled, highways are built and public lighting is reformed.

In the eighties a bullring was built and the sports centre was built and in the nineties a new health center and some schools opened. During these decades, Algete experience important growth due to emigration from rural areas.

Geography 
Algete is located just 20 km northeast of the urban developments of Sanchinarro and Las Tablas, in Madrid. It has an area of 38 km2. The western area comprises a plain through which the Jarama River flows. Algete, as the main population centre, is located between hills.

Algete is surrounded by crops fields, eucalyptus forests and scrubland. It borders the municipalities of Fuente el Saz del Jarama, San Sebastián de los Reyes, Valdeolmos-Alalpardo, Cobeña, Daganzo de Arriba, El Molar, San Agustín del Guadalix and Colmenar Viejo.

The altitude of the municipality varies between 600 and 780 metres above sea level. It has average winter temperatures lower than those of the capital of Madrid. The inhabited areas can be divided into two categories: residential developments and the historic centre:

Residential areas 

 Santo Domingo
 Prado Norte
 Ciudad Jardín Valderrey

Historic Centre 
The historic center is divided into different neighborhoods, such as:

 Palomares
 Retamar
 El Cigarral
 El Tesoro
 Pryconsa
 Los Pazos
 Castillo
 Las Letras

Apart from these areas, there are isolated nuclei such as Dehesa Nueva and several industrial areas such as Rio de Janeiro, Los Nogales or La Garza.

Bus lines

 171: Madrid (Plaza de Castilla) - Santo Domingo urbanization (ALSA)
 180: Alcobendas - Algete (Interbús)
 181: Madrid (Plaza de Castilla) - Algete (Interbús)
 182: Madrid (Plaza de Castilla) - Algete - Valdeolmos (Interbús)
 183: Madrid (Plaza Castilla) - Cobeña - El Casar (Interbús)
 185: Madrid (Plaza de Castilla) - Nuevo Algete (Interbús)
 197: Madrid (Plaza de Castilla) - Torrelaguna (only one diary service from Monday to Friday, stopping in Algete's high schools and ending in Talamanca de Jarama) (ALSA)
 254: Valdeolmos - Fuente el Saz de Jarama - Alcalá de Henares (ALSA)
 263: Madrid (Barajas) - Cobeña - Algete (Interbús)

Notable people
Ángeles Ottein, singer

References

External links 

  

Municipalities in the Community of Madrid